Arnulfo Hernández (31 December 1903 – 19 January 1991) was a Mexican sports shooter. He competed in the 25 m rapid fire pistol event at the 1932 Summer Olympics.

References

External links
 

1903 births
1991 deaths
Mexican male sport shooters
Olympic shooters of Mexico
Shooters at the 1932 Summer Olympics
People from Rioverde, San Luis Potosí